The San Francisco Giants Radio Network is the radio network of the San Francisco Giants. There are 15 stations (six AM, four FM, and five FM translators) in the English-language network, including the flagship KNBR/KNBR-FM (104.5 FM and 680 AM). Six stations (one AM and five FM) carry the team's broadcasts in Spanish, including the Spanish-language flagship KSFN (1510 AM), bringing the total number of radio stations carrying Giants baseball to 21.

The English-language network is identified on-air as the KNBR Northern California Honda Dealers Radio Network.

Announcers include Jon Miller, Dave Flemming, Duane Kuiper, and Mike Krukow on the English-language broadcasts, with Erwin Higueros, Tito Fuentes, and Marvin Benard handling Spanish-language duties.

Network stations

English-language stations

Gray background indicates FM translator.

Spanish-language stations

See also
 List of San Francisco Giants broadcasters

References

External links
Giants radio & television affiliates page

San Francisco Giants
Major League Baseball on the radio

Sports radio networks in the United States